Eriocharis is a genus of beetles in the family Cerambycidae, containing the following species:

 Eriocharis devestivus Monné & Martins, 1973
 Eriocharis lanaris (Blanchard, 1847)
 Eriocharis richardii (Dupont, 1838)

References

Trachyderini
Cerambycidae genera